Qirez is a village in the municipality of Skenderaj, Kosovo. Qirez has a good geographical relief for the pasture of cattle. Thus it is very favourable for farming, beekeeping, and many other activities. Qirez has a population of ~1,000. It has a primary school, a country office and a mosque. It was the site of a battle between the KLA and Serbian forces, and a massacre, in February of 1998 during the Kosovo War.

Notes

References

Villages in Skenderaj
Drenica

sq:Qirez